Jwani Riad Noseir (6 February 1913 – 16 February 2005) was an Egyptian basketball player. He competed in the men's tournament at the 1936 Summer Olympics.

References

External links

1913 births
2005 deaths
Egyptian men's basketball players
Olympic basketball players of Egypt
Basketball players at the 1936 Summer Olympics
Place of birth missing